Danilo Luís Hélio Pereira  (born 9 September 1991), known as Danilo Pereira, is a Portuguese professional footballer who plays as a defensive midfielder or centre-back for Ligue 1 club Paris Saint-Germain and the Portugal national team.

He came through Benfica's youth academy, before signing with Italian Serie A side Parma in 2010. He was consecutively loaned to various clubs, before being signed by Marítimo in 2013. In July 2015, he joined Porto for a reported fee of €4.5 million, winning two Primeira Liga titles and one Taça de Portugal while being part of the squad that won a domestic double in 2020, making 202 official appearances for them. In October 2020, he moved to French side Paris Saint-Germain on an initial one-year loan deal; it was made permanent at the end of the season.

Born in Guinea-Bissau, Pereira represented Portugal at youth level at under-18, under-19, under-20 and under-21 levels, reaching the final of the 2011 FIFA U-20 World Cup. He made his senior international debut in 2015, and was part of the squads that won UEFA Euro 2016 and the 2019 UEFA Nations League Finals on home soil.

Club career

Early career
Born in Bissau, Guinea-Bissau as the oldest child of Quinta Djata, a nurse, Pereira and his family moved to Portugal when he was five. He played his youth football with three clubs in the Lisbon area, finishing his development with Benfica.

Benfica subsequently decided against signing Pereira to a professional contract, and Italian side Parma acquired him on a free transfer. He spent the second half of the 2010–11 season on loan to Aris in Greece and, upon his return to the Stadio Ennio Tardini, made his first appearance in Serie A on 21 December 2011, coming on as a late substitute in a 3–3 home draw against Catania. 

Pereira was loaned again for 2012–13, spending the campaign with Roda in the Eredivisie and being first choice to help his team narrowly avoid relegation.

Marítimo
On 1 August 2013, Pereira returned to Portugal, signing with Marítimo. He made his Primeira Liga debut 17 days later in a 2–1 home victory over his former club Benfica, and scored his first goal on 19 December in the 2–2 home draw with Braga. He made 32 competitive appearances during the season, helping his team to a sixth-place finish to narrowly miss out on qualification for the UEFA Europa League.

Pereira played his last match for the Madeirans on 29 May 2015 in the final of the Taça da Liga, lost 2–1 against Benfica.

Porto
On 2 July 2015, Pereira agreed to a four-year contract with Porto for a transfer fee of €4.5 million, the highest sale in Marítimo's history, with a buyout clause of €40 million. He scored a career-best six goals – from 33 appearances – in his first year, in a runner-up finish. In October 2016, he was named Porto's footballer of the year after winning the "Dragão de Ouro" award. 

Pereira was elected the Primeira Liga's midfielder of the month in September 2017, a feat he replicated in December. He suffered a calf injury during a League Cup game at Sporting CP on 24 January 2018, going on to be sidelined for several months. 

In the final of the Taça de Portugal, on 25 May 2019 against Sporting, following a 2–2 draw after extra time and despite Pereira converting his attempt, Porto lost the penalty shootout 5–4. After the departure of Héctor Herrera for Atlético Madrid, he became the captain. His team won the league title that season, and he opened the scoring in the 2–0 home win over Sporting that sealed the crown on 15 July 2020.

Paris Saint-Germain
On 5 October 2020, Pereira joined Paris Saint-Germain on a one-year loan for a reported fee of €4 million with a conditional obligation to buy at the end of the season for €16 million. He made his debut 15 days later, in a 2–1 home loss against Manchester United in the group stage of the UEFA Champions League. His Ligue 1 bow was also that month, in the 4–0 rout of Dijon also at the Parc des Princes, where he featured as a central defender. His first goal came in the reverse fixture against the latter adversary on 27 February 2021, when he headed in a cross from a corner (same score).

PSG eventually finished second to Lille in the league. This triggered the obligation to make the move permanent, and Pereira therefore became linked to the club until 2025. On 6 February 2022, he scored a brace for the first time in his career to help his team to a 5–1 away win over Lille, and won his first league title that campaign contributing five goals.

International career
Pereira chose to represent Portugal internationally. He was part of the under-20 side that finished second at the 2011 FIFA U-20 World Cup in Colombia, playing all seven games (six complete) and scoring in the 2–0 semi-final win over France.

Pereira made his senior international debut on 31 March 2015, replacing fellow debutant Bernardo Silva after 62 minutes of an eventual 0–2 friendly defeat to Cape Verde in Estoril. He was also selected for the UEFA Euro 2016 squad by manager Fernando Santos, scoring his first goal in the last warm-up game, a 7–0 victory against Estonia in Lisbon on 8 June. He made five appearances for the champions in the finals in France.

Having missed the 2018 FIFA World Cup due to injury, Pereira was earlier picked for the 2017 FIFA Confederations Cup and later Euro 2020 and the 2022 World Cup. In the latter tournament, he fractured a rib in the first group fixture against Ghana, taking part in no further games.

Career statistics

Club

International

 Score and results list Portugal's score first, score column indicates score after each Pereira goal.

Honours
Porto
Primeira Liga: 2017–18, 2019–20
Taça de Portugal: 2019–20

Paris Saint-Germain
Ligue 1: 2021–22
Coupe de France: 2020–21
Trophée des Champions: 2020, 2022

Portugal U20
FIFA U-20 World Cup runner-up: 2011

Portugal
UEFA European Championship: 2016
UEFA Nations League: 2018–19
FIFA Confederations Cup third place: 2017

Individual
SJPF Young Player of the Month: August/September 2015
SJPF Primeira Liga Team of the Year: 2016, 2017
FC Porto Player of the Year – Dragão de Ouro Award: 2016
Primeira Liga Midfielder of the Month: September 2017, December 2017

Orders
 Knight of the Order of Prince Henry
 Commander of the Order of Merit

References

External links

National team data 

1991 births
Living people
Naturalised citizens of Portugal
Sportspeople from Bissau
Portuguese sportspeople of Bissau-Guinean descent
Black Portuguese sportspeople
Bissau-Guinean footballers
Portuguese footballers
Association football defenders
Association football midfielders
Association football utility players
Primeira Liga players
S.L. Benfica footballers
C.S. Marítimo players
FC Porto players
Serie A players
Parma Calcio 1913 players
Super League Greece players
Aris Thessaloniki F.C. players
Eredivisie players
Roda JC Kerkrade players
Ligue 1 players
Paris Saint-Germain F.C. players
Portugal youth international footballers
Portugal under-21 international footballers
Portugal international footballers
UEFA Euro 2016 players
2017 FIFA Confederations Cup players
UEFA Euro 2020 players
2022 FIFA World Cup players
UEFA European Championship-winning players
UEFA Nations League-winning players
Bissau-Guinean expatriate footballers
Portuguese expatriate footballers
Expatriate footballers in Italy
Expatriate footballers in Greece
Expatriate footballers in the Netherlands
Expatriate footballers in France
Portuguese expatriate sportspeople in Italy
Portuguese expatriate sportspeople in Greece
Portuguese expatriate sportspeople in the Netherlands
Portuguese expatriate sportspeople in France
Commanders of the Order of Merit (Portugal)